Luisa María Alcalde Luján (born 24 August 1987) is a Mexican politician. She is the Secretary of Labor of Mexico, and is affiliated with the National Regeneration Movement (formerly to the Citizens' Movement). She was formerly Deputy of the LXII Legislature of the Mexican Congress, representing the Federal District.

References

1987 births
Living people
Politicians from Mexico City
Women members of the Chamber of Deputies (Mexico)
Members of the Chamber of Deputies (Mexico) for Mexico City
Citizens' Movement (Mexico) politicians
Morena (political party) politicians
21st-century Mexican politicians
21st-century Mexican women politicians
Mexican Secretaries of Labor
National Autonomous University of Mexico alumni
Women Secretaries of State of Mexico
Cabinet of Andrés Manuel López Obrador
Deputies of the LXII Legislature of Mexico